Mills Creek is a stream in Marion and Ralls Counties in the U.S. state of Missouri.

A variant name was "Mill Creek". Mills Creek has the name of Charles Mill, an early settler.

See also
List of rivers of Missouri

References

Rivers of Marion County, Missouri
Rivers of Ralls County, Missouri
Rivers of Missouri